Robert David Kleinberg (also referred to as Bobby Kleinberg) is an American theoretical computer scientist and professor of Computer Science at Cornell University.

Early life
Robert Kleinberg was one of the finalists at the 1989 Mathcounts.
He was a member of the 1991 and 1992 USA teams in the International Mathematical Olympiad, winning a silver medal and a gold medal, respectively. He was also a Putnam Fellow in 1996.

He graduated from Iroquois Central High School in Elma, NY, where he was valedictorian.

He is the younger brother of fellow Cornell computer scientist Jon Kleinberg.

Research
Robert Kleinberg is known for his research work on group theoretic algorithms for matrix multiplication, online learning, network coding and greedy embedding, social networks and algorithmic game theory.

Career
Robert Kleinberg received a B.A. in mathematics from Cornell University in 1997 and a Ph.D. in mathematics under Tom Leighton from MIT in 2005. He was a winner of the prestigious Hertz Fellowship, which supported him during his graduate studies. In 2006, he joined the Department of Computer Science at Cornell University as an Assistant Professor. His work has been supported by an NSF Career Award, a Microsoft Research New Faculty Fellowship, a Sloan Foundation Fellowship, and a Google Research Grant.

References

External links
Home page at Cornell

American computer scientists
Cornell University faculty
Cornell University alumni
Massachusetts Institute of Technology School of Science alumni
Living people
International Mathematical Olympiad participants
Year of birth missing (living people)
Putnam Fellows